A party is an individual or group of individuals that compose a single entity which can be identified as one for the purposes of the law. 

Parties include: 

 plaintiff (person filing suit), 
 defendant (person sued or charged with a crime), 
 petitioner (files a petition asking for a court ruling), 
 respondent (usually in opposition to a petition or an appeal), 
 cross-complainant (a defendant who sues someone else in the same lawsuit), or 
 cross-defendant (a person sued by a cross-complainant). 

A person who only appears in the case as a witness is not considered a party.

Courts use various terms to identify the role of a particular party in civil litigation, usually identifying the party that brings a lawsuit as the plaintiff, or, in older American cases, the party of the first part; and the party against whom the case was brought as the defendant, or, in older American cases, the party of the second part. In a criminal case in Nigeria and some other countries the parties are called prosecutor and defendant.

See also 
 Erga omnes
 Ex parte proceeding
 Inter partes proceeding
 Intervention (law)

References

Legal terminology
Law